This list of birds of Ohio includes species documented in the U.S. state of Ohio and accepted by Ohio Bird Records Committee (OBRC). As of October 2022, there were 443 species and a species pair on the official list. Of them, 193 have been documented as breeding in the state, and 121 are review species as defined below. Eight species found in Ohio have been introduced to North America. Two species on the list are extinct, two more might be, and two have been extirpated. Birds that are considered probable escapees, although they may have been sighted flying free, are not included.

This list is presented in the taxonomic sequence of the Check-list of North and Middle American Birds, 7th edition through the 62nd Supplement, published by the American Ornithological Society (AOS). Common and scientific names are also those of the Check-list, except that the common names of families are from the Clements taxonomy because the AOS list does not include them.

The following tags have been used to annotate some species:

(B) Breeding - species having a confirmed nest in modern times
(R) Review list - species which have rarely occurred in Ohio and whose sightings "must be acceptably documented before adding them to the official record" per the OBRC
(I) Introduced - a species established solely as result of direct or indirect human intervention
(E) Extinct - a recent species that no longer exists

Ducks, geese, and waterfowl

Order: AnseriformesFamily: Anatidae

The family Anatidae includes the ducks and most duck-like waterfowl, such as geese and swans. These birds are adapted to an aquatic existence with webbed feet, bills which are flattened to a greater or lesser extent, and feathers that are excellent at shedding water due to special oils. Forty-three species have been recorded in Ohio.

Black-bellied whistling-duck, Dendrocygna autumnalis
Fulvous whistling-duck, Dendrocygna bicolor (R)
Snow goose, Anser caerulescens
Ross's goose, Anser rossii
Greater white-fronted goose, Anser albifrons
Brant, Branta bernicla
Cackling goose, Branta hutchinsii
Canada goose, Branta canadensis (B)
Mute swan, Cygnus olor (I) (B)
Trumpeter swan, Cygnus buccinator (B)
Tundra swan, Cygnus columbianus
Wood duck, Aix sponsa (B)
Garganey, Spatula querquedula (R)
Blue-winged teal, Spatula discors (B)
Cinnamon teal, Spatula cyanoptera (R)
Northern shoveler, Spatula clypeata (B)
Gadwall, Mareca strepera
Eurasian wigeon, Mareca penelope
American wigeon, Mareca americana
Mallard, Anas platyrhynchos (B)
American black duck, Anas rubripes
Northern pintail, Anas acuta (B)
Green-winged teal, Anas crecca (B)
Canvasback, Aythya valisineria (B)
Redhead, Aythya americana (B)
Ring-necked duck, Aythya collaris
Tufted duck, Aythya fuligula (R)
Greater scaup, Aythya marila
Lesser scaup, Aythya affinis (B)
King eider, Somateria spectabilis (R)
Common eider, Somateria mollissima (R)
Harlequin duck, Histrionicus histrionicus
Surf scoter, Melanitta perspicillata
White-winged scoter, Melanitta deglandi
Black scoter, Melanitta americana
Long-tailed duck, Clangula hyemalis
Bufflehead, Bucephala albeola
Common goldeneye, Bucephala clangula
Barrow's goldeneye, Bucephala islandica (R)
Hooded merganser, Lophodytes cucullatus (B)
Common merganser, Mergus merganser (B)
Red-breasted merganser, Mergus serrator
Ruddy duck, Oxyura jamaicensis (B)

New World quail
Order: GalliformesFamily: Odontophoridae

The New World quails are small, plump terrestrial birds only distantly related to the quails of the Old World, but named for their similar appearance and habits. One species has been recorded in Ohio.

Northern bobwhite, Colinus virginianus (B)

Pheasants, grouse, and allies

Order: GalliformesFamily: Phasianidae

Phasianidae consists of the pheasants and their allies. These are terrestrial species, variable in size but generally plump with broad relatively short wings. Many species are gamebirds or have been domesticated as a food source for humans. Five species have been recorded in Ohio.

Wild turkey, Meleagris gallopavo (B)
Ruffed grouse, Bonasa umbellus (B)
Greater prairie-chicken, Tympanuchus cupido (extirpated)
Gray partridge, Perdix perdix (I) (extirpated)
Ring-necked pheasant, Phasianus colchicus (I) (B)

Grebes

Order: PodicipediformesFamily: Podicipedidae

Grebes are small to medium-large freshwater diving birds. They have lobed toes and are excellent swimmers and divers. However, they have their feet placed far back on the body, making them quite ungainly on land. Five species have been recorded in Ohio.

Pied-billed grebe, Podilymbus podiceps (B)
Horned grebe, Podiceps auritus
Red-necked grebe, Podiceps grisegena
Eared grebe, Podiceps nigricollis
Western grebe, Aechmorphorus occidentalis (R)

Pigeons and doves

Order: ColumbiformesFamily: Columbidae

Pigeons and doves are stout-bodied birds with short necks and short slender bills with a fleshy cere. Six species have been recorded in Ohio.

Rock pigeon, Columba livia (I)(B)
Eurasian collared-dove, Streptopelia decaocto (I)(B)
Passenger pigeon, Ectopistes migratorius (E)
Common ground dove, Columbina passerina (R)
White-winged dove, Zenaida asiatica
Mourning dove, Zenaida macroura (B)

Cuckoos

Order: CuculiformesFamily: Cuculidae

The family Cuculidae includes cuckoos, roadrunners, and anis. These birds are of variable size with slender bodies, long tails, and strong legs. The Old World cuckoos are brood parasites. Four species have been recorded in Ohio.

Smooth-billed ani, Crotophaga ani (R)
Groove-billed ani, Crotophaga sulcirostris (R)
Yellow-billed cuckoo, Coccyzus americanus (B)
Black-billed cuckoo, Coccyzus erythropthalmus (B)

Nightjars and allies

Order: CaprimulgiformesFamily: Caprimulgidae

Nightjars are medium-sized nocturnal birds that usually nest on the ground. They have long wings, short legs, and very short bills. Most have small feet, of little use for walking, and long pointed wings. Their soft plumage is cryptically colored to resemble bark or leaves. Three species have been recorded in Ohio.

Common nighthawk,  Chordeiles minor (B)
Chuck-will's-widow, Antrostomus carolinensis (B)
Eastern whip-poor-will, Antrostomus vociferus (B)

Swifts
Order: ApodiformesFamily: Apodidae

The swifts are small birds which spend the majority of their lives flying. These birds have very short legs and never settle voluntarily on the ground, perching instead only on vertical surfaces. Many swifts have very long, swept-back wings which resemble a crescent or boomerang. Two species have been recorded in Ohio.

Chimney swift, Chaetura pelagica (B)
White-throated swift, Aeronautes saxatalis (R)

Hummingbirds

Order: ApodiformesFamily: Trochilidae

Hummingbirds are small birds capable of hovering in mid-air due to the rapid flapping of their wings. They are the only birds that can fly backwards. Seven species have been recorded in Ohio.

Mexican violetear, Colibri thalassinus (R)
Ruby-throated hummingbird, Archilochus colubris (B)
Black-chinned hummingbird, Archilochus alexandri (R)
Anna's hummingbird, Calypte anna (R)
Calliope hummingbird, Selasphorus calliope (R)
Rufous hummingbird, Selasphorus rufus
Allen's hummingbird, Selasphorus sasin (R)

Rails, gallinules, and coots

Order: GruiformesFamily: Rallidae

Rallidae is a large family of small to medium-sized birds which includes the rails, crakes, coots, and gallinules. The most typical family members occupy dense vegetation in damp environments near lakes, swamps, or rivers. In general they are shy and secretive birds, making them difficult to observe. Most species have strong legs and long toes which are well adapted to soft uneven surfaces. They tend to have short, rounded wings and tend to be weak fliers. Eight species have been recorded in Ohio.

King rail, Rallus elegans (B)
Virginia rail, Rallus limicola (B)
Sora, Porzana carolina (B)
Common gallinule, Gallinula galeata (B)
American coot, Fulica americana (B)
Purple gallinule, Porphyrio martinicus (B) (R)
Yellow rail, Coturnicops noveboracensis
Black rail, Laterallus jamaicensis (R)

Limpkin
Order: GruiformesFamily: Aramidae

The limpkin is an odd bird that looks like a large rail, but is skeletally closer to the cranes. It is found in marshes with some trees or scrub in the Caribbean, South America, and southern Florida.

Limpkin, Aramus guarauna (R)

Cranes
Order: GruiformesFamily: Gruidae

Cranes are large, long-legged, and long-necked birds. Unlike the similar-looking but unrelated herons, cranes fly with necks outstretched, not pulled back. Most have elaborate and noisy courting displays or "dances". Two species have been recorded in Ohio.

Sandhill crane, Antigone canadensis (B)
Whooping crane, Grus americana (R)

Stilts and avocets
Order: CharadriiformesFamily: Recurvirostridae

Recurvirostridae is a family of large wading birds which includes the avocets and stilts. The avocets have long legs and long up-curved bills. The stilts have extremely long legs and long, thin, straight bills. Two species have been recorded in Ohio.

Black-necked stilt, Himantopus mexicanus (B)
American avocet, Recurvirostra americana

Plovers and lapwings

Order: CharadriiformesFamily: Charadriidae

The family Charadriidae includes the plovers, dotterels, and lapwings. They are small to medium-sized birds with compact bodies, short thick necks, and long, usually pointed, wings. They are found in open country worldwide, mostly in habitats near water. Eight species have been recorded in Ohio.

Northern lapwing, Vanellus vanellus (R)
Black-bellied plover, Pluvialis squatarola
American golden-plover, Pluvialis dominica
Killdeer, Charadrius vociferus (B)
Semipalmated plover, Charadrius semipalmatus
Piping plover, Charadrius melodus
Wilson's plover, Charadrius wilsonia (R)
Snowy plover, Charadrius nivosus (R)

Sandpipers and allies

Order: CharadriiformesFamily: Scolopacidae

Scolopacidae is a large diverse family of small to medium-sized shorebirds including the sandpipers, curlews, godwits, shanks, tattlers, woodcocks, snipes, dowitchers, and phalaropes. The majority of these species eat small invertebrates picked out of the mud or soil. Different lengths of legs and bills enable multiple species to feed in the same habitat, particularly on the coast, without direct competition for food. Thirty-seven species have been recorded in Ohio.

Upland sandpiper, Bartramia longicauda (B)
Whimbrel, Numenius phaeopus
Eskimo curlew, Numenius borealis (E?) (R)
Long-billed curlew, Numenius americanus (R)
Hudsonian godwit, Limosa haemastica
Marbled godwit, Limosa fedoa
Ruddy turnstone, Arenaria interpres
Red knot, Calidris canutus
Ruff, Calidris pugnax
Sharp-tailed sandpiper, Calidris acuminata (R)
Stilt sandpiper, Calidris himantopus
Curlew sandpiper, Calidris ferruginea (R)
Red-necked stint, Calidris ruficollis (R)
Sanderling, Calidris alba
Dunlin, Calidris alpina
Purple sandpiper, Calidris maritima
Baird's sandpiper, Calidris bairdii
Least sandpiper, Calidris minutilla
White-rumped sandpiper, Calidris fuscicollis 
Buff-breasted sandpiper, Calidris subruficollis
Pectoral sandpiper, Calidris melanotos
Semipalmated sandpiper, Calidris pusilla
Western sandpiper, Calidris mauri
Short-billed dowitcher, Limnodromus griseus
Long-billed dowitcher, Limnodromus scolopaceus
Eurasian woodcock, Scolopax rusticola (R)
American woodcock, Scolopax minor (B)
Wilson's snipe, Gallinago delicata (B)
Spotted sandpiper, Actitis macularia (B)
Solitary sandpiper, Tringa solitaria
Lesser yellowlegs, Tringa flavipes
Willet, Tringa semipalmata
Spotted redshank, Tringa erythropus (R)
Greater yellowlegs, Tringa melanoleuca 
Wilson's phalarope, Phalaropus tricolor (B)
Red-necked phalarope, Phalaropus lobatus
Red phalarope, Phalaropus fulicarius

Skuas and jaegers
Order: CharadriiformesFamily: Stercorariidae

Skuas and jaegers are in general medium to large birds, typically with gray or brown plumage, often with white markings on the wings. They have longish bills with hooked tips and webbed feet with sharp claws. They look like large dark gulls, but have a fleshy cere above the upper mandible. They are strong, acrobatic fliers. Three species have been recorded in Ohio.

Pomarine jaeger, Stercorarius pomarinus
Parasitic jaeger, Stercorarius parasiticus
Long-tailed jaeger, Stercorarius longicaudus

Auks, murres, and puffins
Order: CharadriiformesFamily: Alcidae

The family Alcidae includes auks, murres, and puffins. These are short-winged birds that live on the open sea and normally only come ashore for breeding. Five species have been recorded in Ohio.

Thick-billed murre, Uria lomvia (R)
Black guillemot, Cepphus grylle (R)
Long-billed murrelet, Brachyramphus perdix (R)
Ancient murrelet, Synthliboarmphus antiquus (R)
Atlantic puffin, Fratercula arctica (R)

Gulls, terns and skimmers

Order: CharadriiformesFamily: Laridae

Laridae is a family of medium to large seabirds and includes gulls, terns, kittiwakes, and skimmers. They are typically gray or white, often with black markings on the head or wings. They have stout, longish bills and webbed feet. Thirty species have been recorded in Ohio.

Black-legged kittiwake, Rissa tridactyla
Ivory gull, Pagophila eburnea (R)
Sabine’s gull, Xema sabini
Bonaparte's gull, Chroicocephalus philadelphia
Black-headed gull, Chroicocephalus ridibundus
Little gull, Hydrocoleus minutus
Ross's gull, Rhodostethia rosea (R)
Laughing gull, Leucophaeus atricilla
Franklin's gull, Leucophaeus pipixcan
Black-tailed gull, Larus crassirostris (R)
Heermann's gull, Larus heermanni (R)
Common gull/short-billed gull, Larus canus/Larus brachyrhynchus (R)
Ring-billed gull, Larus delawarensis (B)
California gull, Larus californicus
Herring gull, Larus argentatus (B)
Iceland gull, Larus glaucoides
Lesser black-backed gull, Larus fuscus
Slaty-backed gull, Larus schistisagus (R)
Glaucous gull, Larus hyperboreus
Great black-backed gull, Larus marinus
Kelp gull, Larus dominicanus (R)
Sooty tern, Onychoprion fuscatus (R)
Least tern, Sternula antillarum
Large-billed tern, Phaetusa simplex (R)
Caspian tern, Hydroprogne caspia
Black tern, Chlidonias niger (B)
Common tern, Sterna hirundo (B)
Arctic tern, Sterna paradisaea (R)
Forster's tern, Sterna forsteri
Royal tern, Thalasseus maximus (R)

Loons
Order: GaviiformesFamily: Gaviidae

Loons are aquatic birds the size of a large duck, to which they are unrelated. Their plumage is largely gray or black, and they have spear-shaped bills. Loons swim well and fly adequately, but are almost hopeless on land, because their legs are placed towards the rear of the body. Four species have been recorded in Ohio.

Red-throated loon, Gavia stellata
Arctic loon, Gavia arctica (R)
Pacific loon, Gavia pacifica
Common loon, Gavia immer

Northern storm-petrels
Order: ProcellariiformesFamily: Hydrobatidae

The storm-petrels are the smallest seabirds, relatives of the petrels, feeding on planktonic crustaceans and small fish picked from the surface, typically while hovering. The flight is fluttering and sometimes bat-like. One species has been recorded in Ohio.

Leach's storm-petrel, Hydrobates leucorhous (R)

Shearwaters and petrels
Order: ProcellariiformesFamily: Procellariidae

The procellariids are the main group of medium-sized "true petrels", characterized by united nostrils with medium septum and a long outer functional primary. One species has been recorded in Ohio.

Black-capped petrel, Pterodroma hasitata (R)

Storks
Order: CiconiiformesFamily: Ciconiidae

Storks are large, heavy, long-legged, long-necked wading birds with long stout bills and wide wingspans. They lack the powder down that other wading birds such as herons, spoonbills, and ibises use to clean off fish slime. Storks lack a pharynx and are mute. One species has been recorded in Ohio.

Wood stork, Mycteria americana (R)

Frigatebirds
Order: SuliformesFamily: Fregatidae

Frigatebirds are large seabirds usually found over tropical oceans. They are large, black, or black-and-white, with long wings and deeply forked tails. The males have colored inflatable throat pouches. They do not swim or walk and cannot take off from a flat surface. Having the largest wingspan-to-body-weight ratio of any bird, they are essentially aerial, able to stay aloft for more than a week. One species has been recorded in Ohio.

Magnificent frigatebird, Fregata magnificens (R)

Boobies and gannets
Order: SuliformesFamily: Sulidae

The sulids comprise the gannets and boobies. Both groups are medium-large coastal seabirds that plunge-dive for fish. Two species have been recorded in Ohio.

Brown booby, Sula leucogaster (R)
Northern gannet, Morus bassanus (R)

Anhingas
Order: SuliformesFamily: Anhingidae

Anhingas are cormorant-like water birds with very long necks and long, straight beaks. They are fish eaters which often swim with only their neck above the water. One species has been recorded in Ohio.

Anhinga, Anhinga anhinga (R)

Cormorants and shags
Order: SuliformesFamily: Phalacrocoracidae

Cormorants are medium-to-large aquatic birds, usually with mainly dark plumage and areas of colored skin on the face. The bill is long, thin, and sharply hooked. Their feet are four-toed and webbed. Three species have been recorded in Ohio.

Great cormorant, Phalacrocorax carbo (R)
Double-crested cormorant, Nannopterum auritum (B)
Neotropic cormorant, Nannopterum brasilianum

Pelicans

Order: PelecaniformesFamily: Pelecanidae

Pelicans are very large water birds with a distinctive pouch under their beak. Like other birds in the order Pelecaniformes, they have four webbed toes. Two species have been recorded in Ohio.

American white pelican, Pelecanus erythrorhynchos
Brown pelican, Pelecanus occidentalis

Herons, egrets, and bitterns

Order: PelecaniformesFamily: Ardeidae

The family Ardeidae contains the herons, egrets, and bitterns. Herons and egrets are medium to large wading birds with long necks and legs. Bitterns tend to be shorter necked and more secretive. Members of Ardeidae fly with their necks retracted, unlike other long-necked birds such as storks, ibises, and spoonbills. Twelve species have been recorded in Ohio.

American bittern, Botaurus lentiginosus (B)
Least bittern, Ixobrychus exilis (B)
Great blue heron, Ardea herodias (B)
Great egret, Ardea alba (B)
Snowy egret, Egretta thula (B)
Little blue heron, Egretta caerulea (B)
Tricolored heron, Egretta tricolor (R)
Reddish egret, Egretta rufescens (R)
Cattle egret, Bubulcus ibis (B)
Green heron, Butorides virescens (B)
Black-crowned night-heron, Nycticorax nycticorax (B)
Yellow-crowned night-heron, Nyctanassa violacea (B)

Ibises and spoonbills
Order: PelecaniformesFamily: Threskiornithidae

The family Threskiornithidae includes the ibises and spoonbills. They have long, broad wings. Their bodies tend to be elongated, the neck more so, with rather long legs. The bill is also long, decurved in the case of the ibises, straight and distinctively flattened in the spoonbills. Four species have been recorded in Ohio.

White ibis, Eudocimus albus (R)
Glossy ibis, Plegadis falcinellus
White-faced ibis, Plegadis chihi
Roseate spoonbill, Platalea ajaja (R)

New World vultures
Order: CathartiformesFamily: Cathartidae

The New World vultures are not closely related to Old World vultures, but superficially resemble them because of convergent evolution. Like the Old World vultures, they are scavengers, however, unlike Old World vultures, which find carcasses by sight, New World vultures have a good sense of smell with which they locate carcasses. Two species have been recorded in Ohio.

Black vulture, Coragyps atratus (B)
Turkey vulture, Cathartes aura (B)

Osprey
Order: AccipitriformesFamily: Pandionidae

Pandionidae is a monotypic family of fish-eating birds of prey.  Its single species possesses a very large and powerful hooked beak, strong legs, strong talons, and keen eyesight.

Osprey, Pandion haliaetus (B)

Hawks, eagles, and kites

Order: AccipitriformesFamily: Accipitridae

Accipitridae is a family of birds of prey which includes hawks, eagles, kites, harriers, and Old World vultures. These birds have very large powerful hooked beaks for tearing flesh from their prey, strong legs, powerful talons, and keen eyesight. Fifteen species have been recorded in Ohio.

White-tailed kite, Elanus leucurus (R)
Swallow-tailed kite, Elanoides forficatus (R) extirpated
Golden eagle, Aquila chrysaetos
Northern harrier, Circus hudsonius (B)
Sharp-shinned hawk, Accipiter striatus (B)
Cooper's hawk, Accipiter cooperii (B)
Northern goshawk, Accipiter gentilis (R)
Bald eagle, Haliaeetus leucocephalus (B)
Mississippi kite, Ictinia mississippiensis (B)
Harris's hawk, Parabuteo unicinctus (R)
Red-shouldered hawk, Buteo lineatus (B)
Broad-winged hawk, Buteo platypterus (B)
Swainson's hawk, Buteo swainsoni (R)
Red-tailed hawk, Buteo jamaicensis (B)
Rough-legged hawk, Buteo lagopus

Barn-owls
Order: StrigiformesFamily: Tytonidae

Barn-owls are medium to large owls with large heads and characteristic heart-shaped faces. They have long strong legs with powerful talons. One species has been recorded in Ohio.

Barn owl, Tyto alba (B)

Owls

Order: StrigiformesFamily: Strigidae

Typical owls are small to large solitary nocturnal birds of prey. They have large forward-facing eyes and ears, a hawk-like beak, and a conspicuous circle of feathers around each eye called a facial disk. Eleven species have been recorded in Ohio.

Eastern screech-owl, Megascops asio (B)
Great horned owl, Bubo virginianus (B)
Snowy owl, Bubo scandiacus
Northern hawk owl, Surnia ulula (R)
Burrowing owl, Athene cunicularia (R)
Barred owl, Strix varia (B)
Great gray owl, Strix nebulosa (R)
Long-eared owl, Asio otus
Short-eared owl, Asio flammeus
Boreal owl, Aegolius funereus (R)
Northern saw-whet owl, Aegolius acadicus (B)

Kingfishers
Order: CoraciiformesFamily: Alcedinidae

Kingfishers are medium-sized birds with large heads, long, pointed bills, short legs, and stubby tails. One species has been recorded in Ohio.

Belted kingfisher, Megaceryle alcyon (B)

Woodpeckers

Order: PiciformesFamily: Picidae

Woodpeckers are small to medium-sized birds with chisel-like beaks, short legs, stiff tails, and long tongues used for capturing insects. Some species have feet with two toes pointing forward and two backward, while several species have only three toes. Many woodpeckers have the habit of tapping noisily on tree trunks with their beaks. Eleven species have been recorded in Ohio.

Red-headed woodpecker, Melanerpes erythrocephalus (B)
Red-bellied woodpecker, Melanerpes carolinus (B)
Yellow-bellied sapsucker, Sphyrapicus varius (B)
Red-naped sapsucker, Sphyrapicus nuchalis (R)
Black-backed woodpecker, Picoides arcticus (R)
Downy woodpecker, Dryobates pubescens (B)
Red-cockaded woodpecker, Dryobates borealis (R)
Hairy woodpecker, Dryobates villosus (B)
Northern flicker, Colaptes auratus (B)
Pileated woodpecker, Dryocopus pileatus (B)
Ivory-billed woodpecker, Campephilus principalis (E?)

Falcons and caracaras
Order: FalconiformesFamily: Falconidae

Falconidae is a family of diurnal birds of prey, notably the falcons and caracaras. They differ from hawks, eagles, and kites in that they kill with their beaks instead of their talons. Six species have been recorded in Ohio.

Crested caracara, Caracara plancus (R)
American kestrel, Falco sparverius (B)
Merlin, Falco columbarius (B)
Gyrfalcon, Falco rusticolus (R)
Peregrine falcon, Falco peregrinus (B)
Prairie falcon, Falco mexicanus (R)

New World and African parrots
Order: PsittaciformesFamily: Psittacidae

Characteristic features of parrots include a strong, curved bill, an upright stance, strong legs, and clawed zygodactyl feet. Many parrots are vividly colored, and some are multi-colored. Most of the more than 150 species in the family are found in the New World. One species has been recorded in Ohio.

Carolina parakeet, Conuropsis carolinensis (E)

Tyrant flycatchers

Order: PasseriformesFamily: Tyrannidae

Tyrant flycatchers are Passerine birds which occur throughout North and South America. They superficially resemble the Old World flycatchers, but are more robust and have stronger bills. They do not have the sophisticated vocal capabilities of the songbirds. Most, but not all, are rather plain. As the name implies, most are insectivorous. Nineteen species have been recorded in Ohio.

Great crested flycatcher, Myiarchus crinitus (B)
Tropical kingbird, Tyrannus melancholicus (R)
Western kingbird, Tyrannus verticalis (R)
Eastern kingbird, Tyrannus tyrannus (B)
Gray kingbird, Tyrannus dominicensis (R) 
Scissor-tailed flycatcher, Tyrannus forficatus (R)
Olive-sided flycatcher, Contopus cooperi
Eastern wood-pewee, Contopus virens (B)
Yellow-bellied flycatcher, Empidonax flaviventris
Acadian flycatcher, Empidonax virescens (B)
Alder flycatcher, Empidonax alnorum (B)
Willow flycatcher, Empidonax traillii (B)
Least flycatcher, Empidonax minimus (B)
Gray flycatcher, Empidonax wrightii (R)
Dusky flycatcher, Empidonax oberholseri (R)
Pacific-slope flycatcher/Cordilleran flycatcher, Empidonax difficilis/E. occidentalis (R)
Eastern phoebe, Sayornis phoebe (B)
Say's phoebe, Sayornis saya (R)
Vermilion flycatcher, Pyrocephalus rubinus (R)

Vireos, shrike-babblers, and erpornis

Order: PasseriformesFamily: Vireonidae

The vireos are a group of small to medium-sized passerine birds. They are typically greenish in color and resemble wood warblers apart from their heavier bills. Seven species have been recorded in Ohio.

White-eyed vireo, Vireo griseus (B)
Bell's vireo, Vireo bellii (B)
Yellow-throated vireo, Vireo flavifrons (B)
Blue-headed vireo, Vireo solitarius (B)
Philadelphia vireo, Vireo philadelphicus
Warbling vireo, Vireo gilvus (B)
Red-eyed vireo, Vireo olivaceus (B)

Shrikes
Order: PasseriformesFamily: Laniidae

Shrikes are passerine birds known for their habit of catching other birds and small animals and impaling the uneaten portions of their bodies on thorns. A shrike's beak is hooked, like that of a typical bird of prey. Two species have been recorded in Ohio.

Loggerhead shrike, Lanius ludovicianus (B) (R)
Northern shrike, Lanius borealis

Crows, jays, and magpies

Order: PasseriformesFamily: Corvidae

The family Corvidae includes crows, ravens, jays, choughs, magpies, treepies, nutcrackers, and ground jays. Corvids are above average in size among the Passeriformes, and some of the larger species show high levels of intelligence. Five species have been recorded in Ohio.

Blue jay, Cyanocitta cristata (B)
Black-billed magpie, Pica hudsonia (R)
American crow, Corvus brachyrhynchos (B)
Fish crow, Corvus ossifragus (B)
Common raven, Corvus corax (B)

Tits, chickadees, and titmice

Order: PasseriformesFamily: Paridae

The Paridae are mainly small stocky woodland species with short stout bills. Some have crests. They are adaptable birds, with a mixed diet including seeds and insects. Four species have been recorded in Ohio.

Carolina chickadee, Poecile carolinensis (B)
Black-capped chickadee, Poecile atricapilla (B)
Boreal chickadee, Poecile hudsonica (R)
Tufted titmouse, Baeolophus bicolor (B)

Larks
Order: PasseriformesFamily: Alaudidae

Larks are small terrestrial birds with often extravagant songs and display flights. Most larks are fairly dull in appearance. Their food is insects and seeds. One species has been recorded in Ohio.

Horned lark, Eremophila alpestris (B)

Swallows

Order: PasseriformesFamily: Hirundinidae

The family Hirundinidae is adapted to aerial feeding. They have a slender streamlined body, long pointed wings, and a short bill with a wide gape. The feet are adapted to perching rather than walking, and the front toes are partially joined at the base. Eight species have been recorded in Ohio.

Bank swallow, Riparia riparia (B)
Tree swallow, Tachycineta bicolor (B)
Violet-green swallow, Tachycineta thalassina (R)
Northern rough-winged swallow, Stelgidopteryx serripennis (B)
Purple martin, Progne subis (B)
Barn swallow, Hirundo rustica (B)
Cliff swallow, Petrochelidon pyrrhonota (B)
Cave swallow, Petrochelidon fulva (R)

Kinglets
Order: PasseriformesFamily: Regulidae

The kinglets are a small family of birds which resemble the titmice. They are very small insectivorous birds. The adults have colored crowns, giving rise to their names. Two species have been recorded in Ohio.

Ruby-crowned kinglet, Corthylio calendula
Golden-crowned kinglet, Regulus satrapa (B)

Waxwings
Order: PasseriformesFamily: Bombycillidae

The waxwings are a group of passerine birds with soft silky plumage and unique red tips to some of the wing feathers. In the Bohemian and cedar waxwings, these tips look like sealing wax and give the group its name. These are arboreal birds of northern forests. They live on insects in summer and berries in winter. Two species have been recorded in Ohio.

Bohemian waxwing, Bombycilla garrulus (R) 
Cedar waxwing, Bombycilla cedrorum (B)

Nuthatches
Order: PasseriformesFamily: Sittidae

Nuthatches are small woodland birds. They have the unusual ability to climb down trees head first, unlike other birds which can only go upwards. Nuthatches have big heads, short tails, and powerful bills and feet. Three species have been recorded in Ohio.

Red-breasted nuthatch, Sitta canadensis (B)
White-breasted nuthatch, Sitta carolinensis (B)
Brown-headed nuthatch, Sitta pusilla (R)

Treecreepers
Order: PasseriformesFamily: Certhiidae

Treecreepers are small woodland birds, brown above and white below. They have thin pointed down-curved bills, which they use to extricate insects from bark. They have stiff tail feathers, like woodpeckers, which they use to support themselves on vertical trees. One species has been recorded in Ohio.

Brown creeper, Certhia americana (B)

Gnatcatchers
Order: PasseriformesFamily: Polioptilidae

These dainty birds resemble Old World warblers in their structure and habits, moving restlessly through the foliage seeking insects. The gnatcatchers are mainly soft bluish gray in color and have the typical insectivore's long sharp bill. Many species have distinctive black head patterns (especially males) and long, regularly cocked, black-and-white tails. One species has been recorded in Ohio.

Blue-gray gnatcatcher, Polioptila caerulea (B)

Wrens

Order: PasseriformesFamily: Troglodytidae

Wrens are small and inconspicuous birds, except for their loud songs. They have short wings and thin down-turned bills. Several species often hold their tails upright. All are insectivorous. Seven species have been recorded in Ohio.

Rock wren, Salpinctes obsoletus (R)
House wren, Troglodytes aedon (B)
Winter wren, Troglodytes hiemalis (B)
Sedge wren, Cistothorus platensis (B)
Marsh wren, Cistothorus palustris (B)
Carolina wren, Thryothorus ludovicianus (B)
Bewick's wren, Thryomanes bewickii (R)

Mockingbirds and thrashers
Order: PasseriformesFamily: Mimidae

The mimids are a family of passerine birds which includes thrashers, mockingbirds, tremblers, and the New World catbirds. These birds are notable for their vocalization, especially their remarkable ability to mimic a wide variety of birds and other sounds heard outdoors. The species tend towards dull grays and browns in their appearance. Three species have been recorded in Ohio.

Gray catbird, Dumetella carolinensis (B)
Brown thrasher, Toxostoma rufum (B)
Northern mockingbird, Mimus polyglottos (B)

Starlings
Order: PasseriformesFamily: Sturnidae

Starlings are small to medium-sized passerine birds. They are medium-sized passerines with strong feet. Their flight is strong and direct and they are very gregarious. Their preferred habitat is fairly open country, and they eat insects and fruit. Plumage is typically dark with a metallic sheen. One species has been recorded in Ohio.

European starling, Sturnus vulgaris (I)(B)

Thrushes and allies

Order: PasseriformesFamily: Turdidae

The thrushes are a group of passerine birds that occur mainly but not exclusively in the Old World. They are plump, soft plumaged, small to medium-sized insectivores or sometimes omnivores, often feeding on the ground. Many have attractive songs. Ten species have been recorded in Ohio.

Eastern bluebird, Sialia sialis (B)
Mountain bluebird, Sialia currucoides (R)
Townsend's solitaire, Myadestes townsendi (R)
Veery, Catharus fuscescens (B)
Gray-cheeked thrush, Catharus minimus
Swainson's thrush, Catharus ustulatus
Hermit thrush, Catharus guttatus (B)
Wood thrush, Hylocichla mustelina (B)
American robin, Turdus migratorius (B)
Varied thrush, Ixoreus naevius

Old World flycatchers
Order: PasseriformesFamily: Muscicapidae

The Old World flycatchers form a large family of small passerine birds. These are mainly small arboreal insectivores, many of which, as the name implies, take their prey on the wing. One species has been recorded in Ohio.

Northern wheatear, Oenanthe oenanthe (R)

Old World sparrows

Order: PasseriformesFamily: Passeridae

Old World sparrows are small passerine birds. In general, sparrows tend to be small plump brownish or grayish birds with short tails and short powerful beaks. Sparrows are seed eaters, but they also consume small insects. Two species have been recorded in Ohio.

House sparrow, Passer domesticus (I) (B)
Eurasian tree sparrow, Passer montanus (I) (R)

Wagtails and pipits
Order: PasseriformesFamily: Motacillidae

Motacillidae is a family of small passerine birds with medium to long tails. They include the wagtails, longclaws, and pipits. They are slender ground-feeding insectivores of open country. Two species have been recorded in Ohio.

American pipit, Anthus rubescens
Sprague's pipit, Anthus spragueii (R)

Finches, euphonias, and allies

Order: PasseriformesFamily: Fringillidae

Finches are seed-eating passerine birds that are small to moderately large and have a strong beak, usually conical and in some species very large. All have twelve tail feathers and nine primaries. These birds have a bouncing flight with alternating bouts of flapping and gliding on closed wings, and most sing well. Thirteen species have been recorded in Ohio.

Brambling, Fringilla montifringilla (R)
Evening grosbeak, Coccothraustes vespertinus
Pine grosbeak, Pinicola enucleator (R)
Gray-crowned rosy-finch, Leucosticte tephrocotis (R)
House finch, Haemorhous mexicanus (B) (Native to the southwestern US; introduced in the east)
Purple finch, Haemorhous purpureus (B)
Common redpoll, Acanthis flammea
Hoary redpoll, Acanthis hornemanni (R)
Red crossbill, Loxia curvirostra
White-winged crossbill, Loxia leucoptera
Pine siskin, Spinus pinus (B)
American goldfinch, Spinus tristis (B)

Longspurs and snow buntings
Order: PasseriformesFamily: Calcariidae

The Calcariidae are a group of passerine birds that had been traditionally grouped with the New World sparrows, but differ in a number of respects and are usually found in open grassy areas. Four species have been recorded in Ohio.

Lapland longspur, Calcarius lapponicus
Chestnut-collared longspur, Calcarius ornatus (R)
Smith's longspur, Calcarius pictus
Snow bunting, Plectrophenax nivalis

New World sparrows

Order: PasseriformesFamily: Passerellidae

Until 2017, these species were considered part of family Emberizidae. Most of the species are known as sparrows, but these birds are not closely related to the Old World sparrows which are in the family Passeridae. Many of these have distinctive head patterns. Twenty-nine species have been recorded in Ohio.

Cassin's sparrow, Peucaea cassinii (R)
Bachman's sparrow, Peucaea aestivalis (R)
Grasshopper sparrow, Ammodramus savannarum (B)
Black-throated sparrow, Amphispiza bilineata (R)
Lark sparrow, Chondestes grammacus (B)
Lark bunting, Calamospiza melanocorys (R)
Chipping sparrow, Spizella passerina (B)
Clay-colored sparrow, Spizella pallida (B)
Field sparrow, Spizella pusilla (B)
Brewer's sparrow, Spizella breweri (R)
Fox sparrow, Passerella iliaca
American tree sparrow, Spizelloides arborea
Dark-eyed junco, Junco hyemalis (B)
White-crowned sparrow, Zonotrichia leucophrys
Golden-crowned sparrow, Zonotrichia atricapilla (R)
Harris's sparrow, Zonotrichia querula
White-throated sparrow, Zonotrichia albicollis
Vesper sparrow, Pooecetes gramineus (B)
LeConte's sparrow, Ammospiza leconteii
Nelson's sparrow, Ammospiza nelsoni
Baird's sparrow, Centronyx bairdii (R)
Henslow's sparrow, Centronyx henslowii (B)
Savannah sparrow, Passerculus sandwichensis (B)
Song sparrow, Melospiza melodia (B)
Lincoln's sparrow, Melospiza lincolnii
Swamp sparrow, Melospiza georgiana (B)
Green-tailed towhee, Pipilo chlorurus (R)
Spotted towhee, Pipilo maculatus (R)
Eastern towhee, Pipilo erythrophthalmus (B)

Yellow-breasted chat
Order: PasseriformesFamily: Icteriidae

This species was historically placed in the wood-warblers (Parulidae) but nonetheless most authorities were unsure if it belonged there. It was placed in its own family in 2017.

Yellow-breasted chat, Icteria virens

Troupials and allies

Order: PasseriformesFamily: Icteridae

The icterids are a group of small to medium-sized, often colorful passerine birds restricted to the New World and include the grackles, New World blackbirds, and New World orioles. Most species have black as a predominant plumage color, often enlivened by yellow, orange, or red. Fourteen species have been recorded in Ohio.

Yellow-headed blackbird, Xanthocephalus xanthocephalus (B)
Bobolink, Dolichonyx oryzivorus (B)
Eastern meadowlark, Sturnella magna (B)
Western meadowlark, Sturnella neglecta (B)
Orchard oriole, Icterus spurius (B)
Hooded oriole, Icterus cucullatus (R)
Bullock's oriole, Icterus bullockii (R)
Baltimore oriole, Icterus galbula (B)
Red-winged blackbird, Agelaius phoeniceus (B)
Brown-headed cowbird, Molothrus ater (B)
Rusty blackbird, Euphagus carolinus
Brewer's blackbird, Euphagus cyanocephalus
Common grackle, Quiscalus quiscula (B)
Great-tailed grackle, Quiscalus mexicanus (R)

New World warblers
Order: PasseriformesFamily: Parulidae

The wood-warblers are a group of small and often colorful passerine birds restricted to the New World. Most are arboreal, but some, like the ovenbird and the two waterthrushes, are more terrestrial. Most members of this family are insectivores. Forty species have been recorded in Ohio.

Ovenbird, Seiurus aurocapilla (B)
Worm-eating warbler, Helmitheros vermivorus (B)
Louisiana waterthrush, Parkesia motacilla (B)
Northern waterthrush, Parkesia noveboracensis (B)
Golden-winged warbler, Vermivora chrysoptera
Blue-winged warbler, Vermivora cyanoptera (B)
Black-and-white warbler, Mniotilta varia (B)
Prothonotary warbler, Protonotaria citrea (B)
Swainson's warbler, Limnothlypis swainsonii (R)
Tennessee warbler, Leiothlypis peregrina
Orange-crowned warbler, Leiothlypis celata
Nashville warbler, Leiothlypis ruficapilla (B)
Connecticut warbler, Oporornis agilis
Mourning warbler, Geothlypis philadelphia (B)
Kentucky warbler, Geothlypis formosa (B)
Common yellowthroat, Geothlypis trichas (B)
Hooded warbler, Setophaga citrina (B)
American redstart, Setophaga ruticilla (B)
Kirtland's warbler, Setophaga kirtlandii
Cape May warbler, Setophaga tigrina
Cerulean warbler, Setophaga cerulea (B)
Northern parula, Setophaga americana (B)
Magnolia warbler, Setophaga magnolia (B)
Bay-breasted warbler, Setophaga castanea
Blackburnian warbler, Setophaga fusca (B)
Yellow warbler, Setophaga petechia (B)
Chestnut-sided warbler, Setophaga pensylvanica (B)
Blackpoll warbler, Setophaga striata
Black-throated blue warbler, Setophaga caerulescens (B)
Palm warbler, Setophaga palmarum
Pine warbler, Setophaga pinus (B)
Yellow-rumped warbler, Setophaga coronata
Yellow-throated warbler, Setophaga dominica (B)
Prairie warbler, Setophaga discolor (B)
Black-throated gray warbler, Setophaga nigrescens (R)
Townsend's warbler, Setophaga townsendi (R)
Black-throated green warbler, Setophaga virens (B)
Canada warbler, Cardellina canadensis (B)
Wilson's warbler, Cardellina pusilla
Painted redstart, Myioborus pictus (R)

Cardinals and allies

Order: PasseriformesFamily: Cardinalidae

The cardinals are a family of robust, seed-eating birds with strong bills. They are typically associated with open woodland. The sexes usually have distinct plumages. Ten species have been recorded in Ohio.

Summer tanager, Piranga rubra (B)
Scarlet tanager, Piranga olivacea (B)
Western tanager, Piranga ludoviciana (R)
Northern cardinal, Cardinalis cardinalis (B)
Rose-breasted grosbeak, Pheucticus ludovicianus (B)
Black-headed grosbeak, Pheucticus melanocephalus (R)
Blue grosbeak, Passerina caerulea (B)
Indigo bunting, Passerina cyanea (B)
Painted bunting, Passerina ciris
Dickcissel, Spiza americana (B)

See also
List of birds of Cuyahoga Valley National Park
List of birds
Lists of birds by region
List of mammals of Ohio
List of North American birds

References

External links
Ohio Ornithological Society

Ohio
Birds of Ohio